Michael David Johnson (born 11 May 1994) is a Maltese footballer who plays as a defender for Balzan in the Maltese Premier League.

Club career 

Johnson joined Balzan on 12 June 2017, after two seasons in the Premier League with St. Andrews.

International career 
Johnson was a youth international for the Malta national under-21 football team, making his debut in a 3–2 defeat to the Belgium U-21 on 2 September 2016.

Johnson made his international debut for the Malta senior team in a friendly against Finland on 26 March 2018.

References

External links 
 
 

1994 births
Living people
Sportspeople from Burlington, Ontario
Maltese footballers
Malta international footballers
Malta youth international footballers
Balzan F.C. players
St. Andrews F.C. players
Maltese Premier League players
Association football defenders